Fiesch railway station is a metre gauge station serving the municipality of Fiesch, in the Canton of Valais, Switzerland.  The station forms part of the Furka Oberalp Bahn (FO), which connects Brig in Valais, via Furka Base Tunnel, Andermatt in Uri, with Göschenen, Uri, and Disentis/Mustér, Graubünden.  Since , the FO has been owned and operated by the Matterhorn Gotthard Bahn (MGB), following a merger between the FO and the Brig-Visp-Zermatt railway (BVZ).

The railway station was moved in 2019 and completely renewed. It now includes the lower end of the Fiesch - Fiescheralp gondola, further connected to the Eggishorn.

Services 
The following services stop at Fiesch:

 Regio:

The long-distance Glacier Express passes through Fiesch without stopping; the Glacier Express ceased stopping at Fiesch in late 2018.

References

Further reading

External links
 
 
 Matterhorn Gotthard Bahn

Railway stations in Switzerland opened in 1914
Matterhorn Gotthard Bahn stations
Railway stations in the canton of Valais